James King, 1st Lord Eythin (1589–1652) was a Scottish soldier, who served in the Swedish army, and who later supported King Charles I in the Bishops' Wars, and then later in the English Civil War.

Biography
James King was born on Warbester Hoy, in the Orkney Islands. He was recruited into the Swedish Army in 1615, and in 1622 he was a captain in Ruthven's regiment. By 1634 King had gained some prominence and commanded three of the regiments at the siege of Hildersheim. For this action he was promoted Major General. By 1636, he was a Lieutenant General and commanded the left wing of the Swedish Army at the Battle of Wittstock as part of Alexander Leslie's Army of the Weser. His report of the battle, and his role within it lay undetected until recently, but has now been published. After Wittstock, King's cavalry formed an Army Volante supported by his fellow Scot, Major General John Ruthven who had also fought at Wittstock. The conducted a largely successful campaign around Minden throughout early 1637. However, the Swedish campaign began to falter and problems arose with the German allies. Many of the Scots found themselves unpopular in wishing to press for the Restoration of the Palatinate causing tensions with some of their Swedish allies. Moreover, tensions in Scotland saw Leslie leave to form the Army of the Covenant in Scotland leaving King in charge of the remnant Army of the Weser. With this much reduced force, coupled with fresh levies from England led by William Lord Craven, King was part of the allied forces defeated at the Battle of Vlotho. Craven and Prince Rupert of the Rhine were captured by the victorious Imperialists. James King blamed Rupert's rashness for the defeat, while Rupert in turn blamed King's caution. It is clear from the correspondence on the Swedish archives that King had managed to extract Charles Louis and his forces from the field and had them under his protection in Minden throughout October and November, a matter that caused much consternation to Field Marshal Banier who sowed rumours about King preferring the Elector's to Swedish service. This was something King forcefully rejected, although he did seek instruction as to how to deal with Charles Louis and his army. These and similar letters reveal the rumours of King only escaping to Minden "with only five men" to be fantasy as it is clear he had the vast majority of his troops with him in the town.

Because of these accusations, King was sidelined to duties in Stockholm, although he was ennobled. One of the main problems was that the Swedish Chancellor Alexl Oxenstierna, while reaffirming King's loyal service to Sweden, still believed the Scot to be too loyal to Charles Louis - something which did not serve the Swedish agenda. Thus he was pensioned off in 1639. Thereafter King travelled to Hamburg where King Charles employed him initially as a military recruiter.  He sat out the Bishops' Wars between Charles I and the Scottish Covenanters, thus avoiding conflict with his long-time comrade, Alexander Leslie. Indeed, his actions may have been sanctioned by Leslie who appeared to constantly protect him in the Scottish Parliament. However, his two surviving wills indicate that King was either a Roman Catholic or High Lutheran as he invokes the Holy Trinity in each - something not common in the typical Scottish testament of the period.

After the Civil War broke out in England in 1642, King was created Lord Eythin and was despatched to the continent once more to recruit experienced soldiers from the various European armies and acquire munitions. He returned to England in the suite of Queen Henrietta Maria. Landing at Bridlington, he was appointed Lieutenant General to the Marquess of Newcastle.

On 2 July 1644, Prince Rupert relieved York, where Newcastle's army had been besieged. Rupert had fallen out with the Lord General of Royalist forces, Patrick Ruthven, who left the army to join the king after an argument with Rupert. Devoid of an infantry commander, Rupert summoned Newcastle's troops to join him on Marston Moor, where he was preparing for battle with the Covenanter and Parliamentarian besiegers led by Alexander Leslie. The meeting in the late afternoon between Rupert and King was apparently chilly. In the subsequent Battle of Marston Moor, the Royalist army was destroyed, the Royalist cavalry losing discipline and heading off in pursuit of plunder rather than hammering home their initial advantage. Newcastle and his senior officers, among them King, went into exile in Hamburg after quitting Rupert's service in disgust.

In March 1650 he was to have taken part as Lieutenant General in Montrose's expedition which initially landed in the Orkney Islands. But before he left Sweden, he aborted his mission to support Montrose, because Charles II reached an accommodation with the Covenanters and abandoned Montrose (who was subsequently captured by the Covenanters and executed in Edinburgh). King died in Stockholm on 9 June 1652, he was honoured by the Swedish court with a burial in the Riddarholm Church, the burial place of the Swedish kings.

Family
King had two wives. His first wife was Dilliana Van der Borchens (died c. 1634) who came from Pomerania. They had no children. With his second wife, whose name is not known, King had a daughter who died before him. From the wills that King has left to us we know that he left his goods and geir to his nephews, James and David King.

Notes

References

Further reading 

1589 births
1652 deaths
Scottish soldiers
Scottish people of the Thirty Years' War
Cavaliers
People from Orkney
Eythin
Royalist military personnel of the English Civil War
Expatriates of the Kingdom of Scotland in the Swedish Empire